Pterolophia nigrosparsa is a species of beetle in the family Cerambycidae. It was described by Hermann Julius Kolbe in 1893, originally under the genus Praonetha.

References

nigrosparsa
Beetles described in 1893
Taxa named by Hermann Julius Kolbe